Ahmadagha Mammadrza oghlu Bakikhanov (September 5, 1892 — March 26, 1973) was an Azerbaijani tar player, pedagogue. He was awarded the title People's Artist of the Azerbaijan SSR, and Honored Teacher of the Azerbaijan SSR.

Biography 
Ahmad Bakikhanov was born on September 5, 1892 in Baku. He has performed at music gatherings and concerts in Baku since 1920. From the 1930s, he taught mugham at the Azerbaijan State Conservatoire at the invitation of Uzeyir Hajibeyov and then at the Azerbaijan State Music College.

Ahmadagha Bakikhanov created Azerbaijan State Folk Instruments Ensemble in 1931 and he led the ensemble until the end of his life. The ensemble includes tar, saz, oud, qanun, naqareh, oboe and fortepiano.

A. Bakikhanov is the author of such note publications as “Azerbaijani folk colors” (1964), “Azerbaijan rhythmic mughams” (1968), “Mugham, song, color” (1975). A branch of the Azerbaijan State Museum of Musical Culture has been established in Ahmad Bakikhanov's apartment.

Ahmedagha Bakikhanov died on March 26, 1973 in Baku. He was buried in the II Alley of Honor. In 1994, a republican competition was held for students and young people to play mugham on a tar, dedicated to the 100th anniversary of Ahmad Bakikhanov.

Awards 
 Honored Teacher of the Azerbaijan SSR — June 17, 1943
 Honored Artist of the Azerbaijan SSR — 1964
 People's Artist of the Azerbaijan SSR — March 23, 1973
 Order of the Badge of Honour

References

Literature 
 

1892 births
1973 deaths
Tar players
Azerbaijani folk musicians
People's Artists of Azerbaijan
Soviet Azerbaijani people
Bakikhanov family
Honored Art Workers of the Azerbaijan SSR